The National Coordinator for Security and Counterterrorism (Dutch Nationaal Coördinator Terrorismebestrijding en Veiligheid), abbreviated as NCTV, is the principal Dutch counter-terrorism unit. It was established in January 2005 as the Nationaal Coördinator Terrorismebestrijding (NCTb); the unit was enlarged and renamed in October 2012.

The NCTV is under the responsibility of the Minister of Justice and Security, Dilan Yeşilgöz-Zegerius, who in 2022 succeeded Ferdinand Grapperhaus. In charge of the safety of civil aviation and cybersecurity, it also analyses terrorism threats to determine the threat level (minimal, limited, substantial or critical) in the Netherlands. It therefore works closely with the General Intelligence and Security Service (AIVD) and Military Intelligence and Security Service (MIVD).

History
The unit was involved in the investigation of Northwest Airlines Flight 253, an attempted in-flight bomb attack that occurred on 25 December 2009 and originated at Lagos Airport.

Heads
The head of the NCTV unit is appointed by the Minister of the Interior and Kingdom Relations after the approval of the Council of Ministers, as every senior civil servant is in the Netherlands. The following people have served as head of the Nationaal Coördinator Terrorismebestrijding en Veiligheid unit:

 Tjibbe Joustra (27 April 2004 – 1 January 2009);
 Erik Akerboom (1 April 2009 – 1 December 2012);
 Dick Schoof (1 March 2013 – 19 November 2018);
 Pieter-Jaap Aalbersberg (since 1 February 2019).

References

External links

Official website (English version)

Non-military counterterrorist organizations
National law enforcement agencies of the Netherlands
Dutch intelligence agencies